Trifarotene, sold under the brand name Aklief, is a medication for the topical treatment of acne vulgaris. It is a retinoid; more specifically, it is a fourth generation selective retinoic acid receptor (RAR)-γ agonist.

Trifarotene was granted orphan drug designation for the treatment of congenital ichthyosis by both the U.S. Food and Drug Administration (FDA) and the European Medicines Agency (EMA). It was approved for medical use in the United States in October 2019. In December 2019, its labelling and package leaflet text received a decentralised approval for 16 European countries.

Medical uses 
In the United States, trifarotene is indicated for the topical treatment of acne vulgaris in people nine years of age and older.

In both Canada and Australia, it is indicated for the topical treatment of acne vulgaris of the face and/or the trunk in people twelve years of age and older.

Society and culture

Legal status 
Trifarotene was approved for medical use in the United States in October 2019, in Canada in November 2019, and in Australia in January 2021.

References

External links 
 

Retinoids
Benzoic acids
Pyrrolidines
Orphan drugs
Anti-acne preparations